Vannette William Johnson (born May 27, 1930) is a former American football and track coach and college athletics administrator. He served the head football coach at the University of Arkansas at Pine Bluff—known as Arkansas Agricultural, Mechanical & Normal College prior to 1972—for 11 seasons, from 1962 to 1972, compiling a record of 52–44–6.

Johnson played football at Dunbar High School in Little Rock, Arkansas before graduating in 1948.  He then played college football as a quarterback at Arkansas AM&N before he graduated in 1952 with a bachelor's degree in history and government.  He also earned a master's degree in physical  education from the University of Arkansas in 1961. Johnson began his coaching career as an assistant at Merrill High School in Pine Bluff, Arkansas in 1952.  He returned to Arkansas AM&N in 1957 as backfield coach for the football team and head track coach.  In 1962 he was appointed as the school's head football coach and athletic director.

Head coaching record

Football

References

1930 births
Living people
American football quarterbacks
Arkansas–Pine Bluff Golden Lions athletic directors
Arkansas–Pine Bluff Golden Lions football coaches
Arkansas–Pine Bluff Golden Lions football players
College track and field coaches in the United States
High school football coaches in Arkansas
University of Arkansas alumni
Sportspeople from Little Rock, Arkansas
Players of American football from Arkansas
African-American coaches of American football
African-American players of American football
21st-century African-American people
20th-century African-American sportspeople